The Very Best of Billy Idol: Idolize Yourself is a greatest hits album by English singer Billy Idol, released on 24 June 2008 by Capitol Records. It features 16 of Idol's past singles, as well as two new tracks, "John Wayne" and "New Future Weapon". An additional new track, "Fractured", is available exclusively through download retailers. A deluxe CD/DVD set containing 13 music videos was also released. The compilation omitted all videos from the Cyberpunk era and all singles and videos from Devil's Playground.

Track listing

* CD/DVD booklet miscredits David Mallet as director of the video

Personnel
Produced by Keith Forsey except:
 "Shock to the System" (Robin Hancock)
 "Speed" (Ralph Sall, Billy Idol and Steve Stevens)
 "John Wayne" and "New Future Weapon" (Josh Abraham)

Charts

References

2008 greatest hits albums
2008 video albums
Albums with cover art by Shepard Fairey
Billy Idol albums
Music video compilation albums
Capitol Records compilation albums